The Bautek Astir is a German high-wing, single-place, hang glider designed and produced by Bautek, of Kenn, Germany.

Design and development
The Astir is an intermediate glider for recreational flying. It has an unusual bowsprit designed to crumple during a crash landing, preventing damage to the glider structure.

The aircraft is made from aluminum tubing. The wing is covered in Dacron sailcloth and has a Mylar leading edge. Its  span wing is cable braced. The nose angle is 130° and the aspect ratio is 7.6:1. The Astir is certified by DHV as a class 2 glider.

Specifications (Astir)

References

External links
Official website (German language)

Hang gliders